Elmwood Township may refer to the following places in the United States:

 Elmwood Township, Peoria County, Illinois
 Elmwood Charter Township, Michigan in Leelanau County
 Elmwood Township, Michigan in Tuscola County
 Elmwood Township, Minnesota
  Elmwood Township, Saline County, Missouri

Township name disambiguation pages